Clebopride is a dopamine antagonist drug with  antiemetic and prokinetic properties used to treat functional gastrointestinal disorders. Chemically, it is a substituted benzamide, closely related to metoclopramide.

A small Spanish study found that more adverse reactions are reported with clebopride than with metoclopramide, particularly extrapyramidal symptoms.

References 

Antiemetics
Dopamine antagonists
4-Amino-N-(3-(diethylamino)propyl)-2-methoxybenzamides
Piperidines
Chloroarenes